Rehimena is a genus of moths of the family Crambidae described by Walker in 1866.

Species
Rehimena auritincta (Butler, 1886)
Rehimena cissophora (Turner, 1908)
Rehimena dichromalis Walker, [1866]
Rehimena hypostictalis Hampson, 1908
Rehimena infundibulalis (Snellen, 1880)
Rehimena leptophaes (Turner, 1913)
Rehimena monomma (Warren, 1896)
Rehimena phrynealis (Walker, 1859)
Rehimena reductalis Caradja, 1932
Rehimena stictalis Hampson, 1908
Rehimena straminealis South in Leech & South, 1901
Rehimena striolalis (Snellen, 1890)
Rehimena surusalis (Walker, 1859)
Rehimena unimaculalis Hampson, 1912
Rehimena variegata Inoue, 1996
Rehimena villalis Swinhoe, 1906

References

Spilomelinae
Crambidae genera
Taxa named by Francis Walker (entomologist)